Lupinus littoralis is a species of lupine known by the common name seashore lupine. It is native to the coastline of western North America from British Columbia to northern California, where it grows in sandy habitat. The herbage is coated in long, shaggy whitish or silvery hairs. The inflorescence is raceme of whorled flowers each around a centimeter long. The flower is purple in color with a white patch on its banner that fades pinkish. The fruit is a hairy legume pod 3 or 4 centimeters long containing up to 12 seeds.

Some Native American tribes ate the roots.

References

External links
Jepson Manual Treatment

littoralis
Flora of British Columbia
Flora of the West Coast of the United States
Plants described in 1828
Flora without expected TNC conservation status